These are the Billboard Hot 100 number-one singles of 1989. The two longest running number-one singles of 1989 are "Miss You Much" by Janet Jackson and "Another Day in Paradise" by Phil Collins, which each charted at number one for four weeks. "Another Day in Paradise" attained two weeks at number one in 1989 and two more weeks in 1990, achieving four weeks at the top. 1989 ties with 1988 by having the second most number-one hits with 32 songs going to number one during the year.

That year, 12 acts earned their first number one song: Bobby Brown, Sheriff, Paula Abdul, Mike + the Mechanics, Roxette, Fine Young Cannibals, Michael Damian, Bette Midler, New Kids on the Block, Milli Vanilli, Martika, and Bad English. Phil Collins, Paula Abdul, Roxette, Fine Young Cannibals, New Kids on the Block, Richard Marx, and Milli Vanilli were the only acts to hit number one more than once, with Paula Abdul and Milli Vanilli having the most with three, and Phil Collins, Roxette, Fine Young Cannibals, New Kids on the Block, and Richard Marx with two.

Chart history

Number-one artists

See also
1989 in music
List of Billboard number-one singles

References

Additional sources
Fred Bronson's Billboard Book of Number 1 Hits, 5th Edition
Joel Whitburn's Top Pop Singles 1955-2008, 12 Edition
Joel Whitburn Presents the Billboard Hot 100 Charts: The Eighties
Additional information obtained can be verified within Billboard's online archive services and print editions of the magazine.

United States Hot 100
1989